Vadym Meller or Vadim Meller, (1884–1962) was a Ukrainian Soviet painter, avant-garde Cubist, Constructivist and Expressionist artist, theatrical designer, book illustrator, and architect. In 1925 he was  awarded a gold medal for the scenic design of the Berezil' theater in the Exposition Internationale des Arts Décoratifs et Industriels Modernes (Art Deco) in Paris.

Biography

Vadim Meller was born in Saint-Petersburg. He was the second son of a top official in the Ministry of Justice in the Russian Empire. His father, George Meller, was a noble-born Swede; his mother, Helena Caruso, was half Italian and half Greek, and also from a noble family  He married Nina Genke. Vadim Meller died in Kiev.

Education

From 1903–1908, Meller studied at Kyiv University. In 1905, he visited Geneva, Switzerland, where he took art lessons at the private school of Franz Roubaud. In 1908, with the recommendation of Roubaud, he continued his education at the private art school of drawing and painting of Heinrich Knirr in Munich, Germany. There, Meller met fellow student, Paul Klee, who introduced him to Der Blaue Reiter group.

After graduating from the Kiev University with a degree in law, he acquired an artistic education in the Munich Academy of Fine Arts from 1908–1912. V. Meller stayed in close contact with Der Blaue Reiter group. During this time, he also met Wassily Kandinsky, with whom he became friends.

Work

V.Meller started to exhibit his works after moving to Paris, where he joined the Société des Artistes Indépendants. At the same time Vadim Meller was  a student of Antoine Bourdelle. In 1912–1914, together with Kazimir Malevich, Sonia Delaunay, Alexander Archipenko, and Aleksandra Ekster, he  participated in a number of exhibitions  (Salon des Indépendants, Spring Salon, and Salon D' Automne) alongside Pablo Picasso, Georges Braque, and André Derain.

After returning to Kiev in 1915, he worked at easel and monumental painting, graphic design, and costume design. His transition to scenography as his main field of artistic activity took place in the post-revolutionary years. From 1918–1921, he worked with scenographer and dancer Bronislava Nijinska (Vaslav Nijinsky's sister) in her ballet studio. In end of this period he became a professor in The National Academy of Fine Arts and Architecture.

In 1922, Les Kurbas invited V. Meller to the recently founded Berezil' theater.  

In 1925, V. Meller, together with Sonia Terk, Alexandra Exter, and Nathan Altman, participated in Exposition Internationale des Modernes (Art Deco)  in  Paris.There, Meller was awarded a gold medal for his scenic design of the Berezil' theater.  That same year, V.Meller participated in the International Theater Exposition in New York.

V. Meller became the leader of the Constructivism movement in Ukrainian theater design. He worked in the National theater as a chief artist until 1945. From 1925 onward, he also taught at the Kyiv Art Institute (KKHI) together with Vladimir Tatlin and Alexander Bogomazov. Also in 1925, V. Meller became a member of the artists union Association of the Revolutionary Masters of Ukraine together with  David Burliuk (co-founder), Alexander Bogomazov (co-founder), Vasiliy Yermilov, Victor Palmov, and Khvostenko-Khvostov.

In 1928 Vadim Meller participated in the International Press Exhibition  Pressa  Cologne, together with El Lissitzky, Aleksandr Tyshler and Vasyl Yermylov.

V.Meller worked as an acting director of the Monumental Painting and Sculpture Institute of the Academy of Architecture of the Ukrainian SSR (1946–1948), a chief artist of the Kiev Music Comedy Theater (1948–1953), and a chief artist of the Iv. Franko Kiev Academic Theater (1953–1959).

References 

 Vadym Meller's Expressive Constructivism, Olga Petrova, pp. 5–32, Catalog, an Exhibition  Avant-Garde Adventures, National Art Museum of Ukraine (NAMU),  Kiev, Ukraine,2004.
 Vadym Meller:Missionary of Avant-Garde Scenic Design, Tetiana Rudenko, pp 46–68, book "Staging the Ukrainian Avant-Garde of the 1910s and 1920s", Ukrainian Museum, New York, US, 2015.
 Vadim Meller, Zoya Kucherenko, Mistetstvo, Kiev, 1975.
Kyiv to Paris: Ukrainian Art in the European Avant-Garde, 1905-1930, publication By Prof. Myroslav Shkandrij, Department of German and Slavic Studies University of Manitoba, Winnipeg, Canada, Zorya Fine Art, 2003.
 Modernism in Kyiv: Jubilant Experimentation, pp 3,5,11,219,229,257,264,299,415,426,430,492,497,501, etc. edited by Irena R. Makaryk., Virlana Tkacz., University of Toronto Press, 2010 .
 The World Encyclopedia of Contemporary Theatre. Europe, pp. 872–4,883,885, volume 1, Editor Don Rubin, Routledge, Inc., New York, US, 1994.
 Avant-Garde Art in Ukraine, 1910-1930 , contested memory, Vadym Meller  and Sources of Inspiration in Theater, Myroslav Shkandrij, Boston, Academic Studies Press, 2019 .

External links 
 Encyclopedia of Ukraine on Vadym Meller
 Biography on artinvestment.ru
 Z.Kucherenko. Vadym Meller. Kyiv,1975
 Avant-garde Adventures. Vadym Meller, Nina Genke-Meller, Nina Vetrova-Robinson. Kyiv, 2004

1884 births
1962 deaths
Art Deco designers
Constructivism
Cubist artists
Ukrainian avant-garde
Modernist theatre
Modern painters
Soviet architects
Soviet painters
Ukrainian people of Swedish descent
Ukrainian people of Greek descent
Ukrainian people of Italian descent
Artists from Kyiv
Academy of Fine Arts, Munich alumni
Soviet people of Italian descent
Academic staff of the National Academy of Visual Arts and Architecture